Pseudaephnidiogenes is a genus of trematodes in the family Aephnidiogenidae.

Species
Pseudaephnidiogenes africanus (Fischthal & Thomas, 1972) Bray, 1985
Pseudaephnidiogenes rhabdosargi (Prudhoe, 1956) Yamaguti, 1971
Pseudaephnidiogenes rossi Bray, 1985

References

Aephnidiogenidae
Trematode genera